Cherokee is a city in Crawford County, Kansas, United States.  As of the 2020 census, the population of the city was 590.

History
Cherokee had its start in the year 1870 by the building of the railroads through that territory. The town was located at the intersection of three railroads: The Memphis, Kansas & Colorado Railroad; The Kansas City, Fort Scott & Gulf Railroad; and the Missouri Pacific Railroad. It was named from Cherokee County, where it was erroneously thought to be located.

The first post office in Cherokee was established in August, 1870.

Geography

Demographics

2010 census
As of the census of 2010, there were 714 people, 289 households, and 187 families living in the city. The racial makeup of the city was 95.9% White, 0.1% African American, 0.8% Native American, 0.3% from other races, and 2.8% from two or more races. Hispanic or Latino of any race were 1.5% of the population.

There were 289 households, of which 33.2% had children under the age of 18 living with them, 46.7% were married couples living together, 11.8% had a female householder with no husband present, 6.2% had a male householder with no wife present, and 35.3% were non-families. 27.3% of all households were made up of individuals, and 10.8% had someone living alone who was 65 years of age or older. The average household size was 2.47 and the average family size was 2.97.

The median age in the city was 39.7 years. 27% of residents were under the age of 18; 8.3% were between the ages of 18 and 24; 24.2% were from 25 to 44; 26.8% were from 45 to 64; and 13.9% were 65 years of age or older. The gender makeup of the city was 51.5% male and 48.5% female.

2000 census
As of the census of 2000, there were 722 people, 301 households, and 192 families living in the city. The racial makeup of the city was 95.43% White, 0.28% African American, 0.97% Native American, 0.14% Asian, and 3.19% from two or more races. Hispanic or Latino of any race were 0.42% of the population.

There were 301 households, out of which 29.6% had children under the age of 18 living with them, 50.5% were married couples living together, 8.0% had a female householder with no husband present, and 36.2% were non-families. 32.2% of all households were made up of individuals, and 16.6% had someone living alone who was 65 years of age or older. The average household size was 2.40 and the average family size was 3.03.

In the city, the population was spread out, with 26.7% under the age of 18, 6.8% from 18 to 24, 24.9% from 25 to 44, 25.1% from 45 to 64, and 16.5% who were 65 years of age or older. The median age was 38 years. For every 100 females, there were 96.7 males. For every 100 females age 18 and over, there were 94.5 males.

The median income for a household in the city was $29,083, and the median income for a family was $36,389. Males had a median income of $26,739 versus $18,810 for females. The per capita income for the city was $14,693. About 7.8% of families and 14.5% of the population were below the poverty line, including 24.4% of those under age 18 and 14.4% of those age 65 or over.

Government
The Cherokee government consists of a mayor and five council members.  The council meets the 2nd Thursday of each month at 6:30PM.

Education
Cherokee is served by USD 247 Southeast. The Southeast High School mascot is Lancers.

Crawford County Community High School in Cherokee was closed in school unification.

Notable people
 Page Cavanaugh, jazz and pop musician, was born in Cherokee.
 Patricia Martin, children's author, was born in Cherokee.
 Samuel Triplett, Spanish–American War Medal of Honor recipient.

References

External links
 Cherokee - Directory of Public Officials
 USD 247, local school district
 Cherokee city map, KDOT

Cities in Kansas
Cities in Crawford County, Kansas
1870 establishments in Kansas
Populated places established in 1870